The Old Inn, also known as the Old Brick Inn, was built circa 1816 in Saint Michaels, Maryland. It is unusual for Maryland in possessing two-story porches on both its front and back sides.

The Old Inn was listed on the National Register of Historic Places in 1980.

References

External links
, including photo dated 1980, at Maryland Historical Trust

Hotel buildings on the National Register of Historic Places in Maryland
Buildings and structures in Talbot County, Maryland
Commercial buildings completed in 1816
Saint Michaels, Maryland
1816 establishments in Maryland
National Register of Historic Places in Talbot County, Maryland